Sarajevo is a major media centre in Bosnia and Herzegovina.

Communications Regulatory Agency of Bosnia and Herzegovina (www.cra.ba) is responsible for the allocation of broadcasting frequencies in BiH.

Radio stations
In Bosnian language, the original word "Radio" may be replaced by the words "Radio stanica" or "Radio postaja". Almost all radio stations use the RDS and the radio program is available on the Internet, social networks and mobile applications.

Analog radio

Digital radio

Defunct radio

Television

Analog television
The process of digitization is still going on and it is expected to leave the analog frequency bands in 2016.

Digital television

Cable television
Major cable television operators in Sarajevo are Telemach, BH Telecom (Moja TV - IPTV), Logosoft (Super TV - IPTV) and ASK CATV.

Print
The complete list of magazines and newspapers is available at the website Press Council of BiH (www.vzs.ba).

News agencies

See also 
 List of radio stations in Bosnia and Herzegovina
 Television in Bosnia and Herzegovina

References

External links 
CRA website
PEM website
PC BiH website
BHRT website

Mass media in Sarajevo
Communications in Bosnia and Herzegovina